Starless is a studio album by the American post-hardcore band Shiner. It was released in April 2000.

Critical reception
Exclaim! wrote that "Shiner clean up their act by scrapping the lo-fi dirge and replacing it with a less cacophonous brand of guitar rock." The Dallas Observer wrote that "Starless ranked among [2000]'s top albums, showcasing pristine melodies, new drummer Jason Gerken's ticking-time-bomb percussion, subtle wind-chime guitars and deceptively intense vocals." The Coloradoan thought that "[Allen] Epley's songwriting and vocal skills ... are the high point of the release." The Kansas City Star opined that the album is "brighter, richer and more sonically complex and refined" than Lula Divinia.

Track listing

Personnel
 Allen Epley – vocals, guitar
 Paul Malinowski  – bass guitar, backing vocals, production
 Jason Gerken – drums
 Josh Newton – guitar, keyboards, synthetics
 Andy Mueller – art direction, design, photography

References

External links
 thirdgearscratch Starless

2000 albums
Shiner (band) albums